Dark therapy is the practice of keeping people in complete darkness for extended periods of time in an attempt to treat psychological conditions. The human body produces the melatonin hormone, which is responsible for supporting the circadian rhythms. Darkness seems to help keep these circadian rhythms stable. Dark therapy was said to be founded by a German anthropologist by the name of Holger Kalweit. A form of dark therapy is to block blue wavelength lights to stop the disintegration of melatonin. Some studies have shown this process improves the health of the human body, such as by minimizing headaches, chronic fatigue syndrome, and insomnia.

The idea originated in 1998 from research which suggested that systematic exposure to darkness might alter people's mood. Original studies enforced 14 hours of darkness to bipolar patients for three nights straight. This study showed a decrease of manic episodes in the patients. Participation in this study became unrealistic, as patients did not want to participate in treatment of total darkness from 6 p.m. to 8 a.m. More recently, with the discovery of intrinsically photosensitive retinal ganglion cells, it has been hypothesized that similar results could be achieved by blocking blue light, as a potential treatment for bipolar disorder. Researchers exploring blue-blocking glasses have so far considered dark therapy only as an add-on treatment to be used together with psychotherapy, rather than a replacement for other therapies.

Another study consisting of healthy females and males suggested that a single exposure to blue light after being kept in a dim setting could improve health and reduce sleepiness. Contrary to the original claim that decreasing the amount of blue light could help with insomnia, this study suggested improvement with blue light exposure.

See also
 Clinical depression
 Light therapy
 Seasonal affective disorder
 Sleep hygiene

References

Circadian rhythm
Light therapy
Treatment of bipolar disorder